Mosa Lebusa (born 10 October 1992) is a South African soccer player who plays for Mamelodi Sundowns.

References

1992 births
Living people
Sportspeople from Welkom
South African Sotho people
South African soccer players
Association football defenders
Cape Town Spurs F.C. players
Mamelodi Sundowns F.C. players
South African Premier Division players
South Africa international soccer players
Soccer players from the Free State (province)